Richard Medlin (born March 4, 1987) is a former American football running back. He played college football at Fayetteville State University and attended Garner Magnet High School in Garner, North Carolina. He has been a member of the New England Patriots, Miami Dolphins, and Atlanta Falcons.

Professional career

New England Patriots
Medlin was signed by the New England Patriots on August 3, 2011 after going undrafted in the 2011 NFL Draft. He was released by the Patriots on September 2, 2011.

Miami Dolphins
Medlin signed with the Miami Dolphins on December 28, 2011. He appeared in one game with the Dolphins on January 1, 2012 against the New York Jets. He was released by the Dolphins on May 7, 2012.

Atlanta Falcons
Medlin was signed by the Atlanta Falcons on August 5, 2012. He was released by the Falcons on August 25, 2012.

References

External links
Just Sports Stats
NFL Draft Scout
Fayetteville State Broncos bio

Living people
1987 births
Players of American football from Raleigh, North Carolina
American football running backs
African-American players of American football
Fayetteville State Broncos football players
Miami Dolphins players
Garner Magnet High School alumni